John Kestell (fl. 1571) was an English politician.

He was a Member (MP) of the Parliament of England for Bodmin in 1571.

References

Year of birth missing
Year of death missing
English MPs 1571
Members of the pre-1707 English Parliament for constituencies in Cornwall